A Chorus of Disapproval is a 1984 play written by English playwright Alan Ayckbourn.

Synopsis
The story follows a young widower, Guy Jones, as he joins an amateur operatic society that is putting on The Beggar's Opera. He rapidly progresses through the ranks to become the male lead, while simultaneously conducting liaisons with several of the female cast. Many of the songs from The Beggar's Opera are kept within the play, usually being sung with their own, new context.

First productions
Ayckbourn wrote the work for the 1984 summer season at his Stephen Joseph Theatre, Scarborough, where it opened on 2 May. Peter Hall, director of the National Theatre, London, had expressed an interest in the piece and Ayckbourn modified his initial concept  to suit an eventual large-scale production; on 1 August 1985 it opened in the National's Olivier auditorium, with Ayckbourn directing, Michael Gambon playing amateur director Dafydd Llewellyn and Bob Peck as newcomer Guy Jones. The female leads were Gemma Craven, Imelda Staunton and Kelly Hunter.

Film adaptation

Further reading

References

External links
 A Chorus of Disapproval official website
 

Plays by Alan Ayckbourn
Comedy plays
Off-Broadway plays
Laurence Olivier Award-winning plays
West End plays
1984 plays
British plays adapted into films